TopPop is the first regular dedicated pop music television series in the Dutch language area. The Netherlands broadcaster AVRO aired the programme weekly, from 22 September 1970, to 27 June 1988. Presenter Ad Visser hosted for its first fifteen years. The creator and original director of TopPop was Rien van Wijk. Many other directors followed: Egbert van Hees, Geert Popma, Henk Renou, Chris Berger, Jessy Winkelman, Wim van der Linden, Bert van der Veer and Charly Noise. Although TopPop was inspired by British music programme Top of the Pops, it had its own character.

Description

The main approach was to let music artists mime to their latest hit record in the TopPop studio. However, most music acts in the Dutch pop charts were foreign to the Netherlands, and frequently not available for a performance in the studio. If this was the case, it was sometimes possible for the TopPop camera crew to meet the artist at another location. Consequently, artists were filmed around the world, including Tom Browne in a studio in New York City, David Cassidy at the airport in Schiphol, and Barry White at his home in Los Angeles. If there was no way to feature the artists on TopPop, their promo video would be played - if one existed, since prior to the 1980s these were not routinely created. If all else failed, there was a fourth option that the programme frequently had to resort to: hit songs were played to a dance routine by dancer and choreographer Penney de Jager and her troupe. When music videos became more common on television, the popularity of TopPop decreased and the programme was stopped in 1988. TopPop was chosen as the programme of the century in a poll in 2000 by Televizier.

For many Dutch and Flemish viewers, TopPop was the primary source of information about pop music. TopPop compiled its own hit chart, based on viewers' top-ten lists, sent in on postcards, from 1970 to 1974, from 1978 to 1982 and from 23 February 1986 to 10 July 1988. However, it used the Dutch National Hitparade, a sales-based list, from 1974 to 1978 and from 1982 to 1986.

In the last programme of each year, the annual complete Top 10 was broadcast. There were performances by studio guests, and there were polls among viewers on the most popular artist, group and DJ. Looking back on the year 1976, Ad Visser and Krijn Torringa were sitting behind a desk in an office which made it a parody of Van Oekel's Discohoek. This absurd programme was itself a parody of TopPop.

Notable performances include one in 1977, by Iggy Pop, who refused to leave his dressing room and then, during a rehearsal, stormed dramatically and unexpectedly onto the studio floor. He spent most of the song writhing on the floor without a shirt on, miming his hit single and destroying some plants that had been put on the floor as decoration. For many young viewers in the Netherlands, this was their first encounter with punk rock.

Some TopPop-made videos were of such quality, the performing artist chose to use it as their promotional video. Examples are the 1974 sequence of an eye-patched David Bowie miming to "Rebel Rebel", and Nena walking through a wood-cuttery at Crailoo near Hilversum, imagining a post-war devastated area fit for the Cold War atmosphere of her 1983 hit "99 Red Balloons".

The famous archive of performances can be viewed online.

Selected list of performers

 10cc
 ABBA
 ABC
 AC/DC
 Ace
 Alphaville
 Adam Ant
 Amanda Lear
 America
 Afric Simone
 Apollonia 6
 Ashford & Simpson
 Rick Astley
 Charles Aznavour
 Aztec Camera
 The B52s
 Bananarama
 The Bangles
 John Barry
 The Beat
 Bee Gees
 Pat Benatar
 Plastic Bertrand
 Black Sabbath
 Blondie
 Michael Bolton
 Boney M.
 The Boomtown Rats
 David Bowie
 Bow Wow Wow
 Jacques Brel
 James Brown
 Bucks Fizz
 Rocky Burnette
 Kate Bush
 BZN
 The Carpenters
 Ray Charles
 Chas & Dave
 Cheap Trick
 Chic
 The Christians
 Jimmy Cliff
 Joe Cocker
 Commodores
 Ry Cooder
 Elvis Costello
 Kevin Coyne
 Randy Crawford
 The Cure
 Dead or Alive 
 Culture Club
 Cutting Crew
 Deacon Blue
 Kiki Dee
 Dalida
 Def Leppard
 John Denver
 Dire Straits
 Divine
 Doe Maar
 Lonnie Donegan
 Doobie Brothers
 Dr. Hook & the Medicine Show
 Duran Duran
 Ian Dury and The Blockheads
 Sheila E.
 Sheena Easton
 Electric Light Orchestra
 Brian Eno
 Erasure
 Europe
 Marianne Faithfull
 Falco
 Fatback Band
 Focus
 Foreigner
 Four Tops
 Samantha Fox
 Peter Frampton
 Gloria Gaynor
 Genesis
 George Baker Selection
 The Go-Go's
 Golden Earring
 Rupert Holmes
 Grandmaster Flash and the Furious Five
 Eddy Grant
 Gruppo Sportivo
 The Guess Who
 Bill Haley & His Comets
 Hall & Oates
 Emmylou Harris
 Heart
 Marcia Hines
 The Hollies
 Bruce Hornsby & The Range
 Hot Chocolate
 The Housemartins
 Whitney Houston
 The Human League
 The Icicle Works
 Julio Iglesias
 INXS
 It's Immaterial
 The J. Geils Band
 The Jacksons
 Janet Jackson
 Jermaine Jackson
 Joe Jackson
 La Toya Jackson
 The Jam
 Rick James
 Japan
 Jean-Michel Jarre
 Joan Jett & the Blackhearts
 Elton John
 Johnny Hates Jazz
 Grace Jones
 Howard Jones
 Tom Jones
 KC and the Sunshine Band
 Kiss
 Chaka Khan
 Gladys Knight & the Pips
 Kool & the Gang
 Labelle
 Patti LaBelle
 Cyndi Lauper
 Level 42
 Jona Lewie
 Limahl
 Nick Lowe
 Phil Lynott
 Madness
 Madonna
 Manfred Mann
 Bob Marley & The Wailers
 Don McLean
 Meat Loaf
 John Cougar Mellencamp
 John Miles
 Mink DeVille
 The Modern Lovers
 Eddie Money
 Gary Moore
 Giorgio Moroder
 Nana Mouskouri
 Nazareth
 Nena
 Robbie Nevil
 New Musik
 Randy Newman
 Nits
 Gilbert O'Sullivan
 Billy Ocean
 Roy Orbison
 Orchestral Manoeuvres in the Dark
 Robert Palmer
 Graham Parker & The Rumour
 The Pebbles
 The Pointer Sisters
 The Police
 Iggy Pop
 Prefab Sprout
 Billy Preston
 The Pretenders
 The Primitives
 The Proclaimers
 Procol Harum
 Queen
 Gerry Rafferty
 Ramones
 Johnnie Ray
 Chris Rea
 Redbone
 Cliff Richard
 Smokey Robinson
 The Romantics
 Linda Ronstadt
 Demis Roussos
 Roxy Music
 The Runaways
 Sad Café
 Sade
 Sandra Lauer
 Seal
 The Brothers Johnson
 The Selecter
 The Shadows
 Shalamar
 Del Shannon
 Feargal Sharkey
 Simply Red
 Siouxsie and the Banshees
 Sister Sledge
 Slade
 Percy Sledge
 Grace Slick
 Soft Cell
 Spagna
 Spandau Ballet
 Sparks
 The Specials
 Split Enz
 Squeeze
 Stars on 45
 Status Quo
 Steve Harley & Cockney Rebel
 Al Stewart
 Rod Stewart
 The Stranglers
 Stray Cats
 The Style Council
 The Sugarhill Gang
 Donna Summer
 Supertramp
 Patrick Swayze
 The Sweet
 Swing Out Sister
 Talk Talk
 Tavares (group)
 Tears for Fears
 The The
 Toots Thielemans
 Thin Lizzy
 Thompson Twins
 Tom Robinson Band
 The Trammps
 Tubeway Army
 Bonnie Tyler
 UB40
 Uriah Heep
 Vanity 6
 Gino Vannelli
 Village People
 Visage
 Wang Chung
 Dionne Warwick
 Barry White
 Kim Wilde
 Matthew Wilder
 Steve Winwood
 Wayne Wade
 Wizzard
 Womack & Womack
 Syreeta Wright
 XTC
 Paul Young
 Matia Bazar

References

External links

TopPop archive

Dutch music television series
1970s Dutch television series
1980s Dutch television series
1970 Dutch television series debuts
1988 Dutch television series endings
Pop music television series